Ribosomal protein L26 like 1 is a protein that in humans is encoded by the RPL26L1 gene.

Function

This gene encodes a protein that shares high sequence similarity with RPL26. Alternative splicing results in multiple transcript variants encoding the same protein. [provided by RefSeq, Dec 2015].

References

Further reading